Johannes Schaaf (7 April 1933 – 1 November 2019) was a German film, theatre and opera director and actor. Several of his films have been internationally recognized. His focus shifted to opera in the 1980s and he worked with many of the leading international opera houses within Europe, and was invited to direct at several renowned opera houses in the United States and Asia.

Biography
He initially studied medicine at the Universities of Tübingen and Berlin, but moved into theatre during the 1950s, during which he worked at the Staatstheater Stuttgart as actor and assistant stage director. 1958 he started directing himself at the Theater Ulm. During the 1960s, he became acclaimed through multiple movie and TV productions. His film Trotta was nominated for the Palme d'Or at the 1972 Cannes Film Festival. He was head of the jury at the 19th Berlin International Film Festival. His movie Tattoo was one of the first films to address the generational tensions during the early years of Germany's "student revolution".

In the 1980s, he turned more and more towards theatre and opera. His last movie was Momo in 1986. He directed plays at the Vienna Burgtheater, the Schiller Theater in Berlin, the Residenztheater in Munich and the Salzburg Festival (Leonce and Lena, Nathan the Wise, La Folle Journée by Beaumarchais). He directed opera at the Salzburg Festival: Capriccio, The Magic Flute and Die Entführung aus dem Serail, working with conductor Georg Solti. At the Royal Opera House Covent Garden in London he directed Mozart's Idomeneo, The Marriage of Figaro (1987), Così fan tutte (1989), and Don Giovanni. With conductor Nikolaus Harnoncourt he directed Idomeneo (1987) and Così fan tutte (1989) at the Vienna State Opera. He worked at the Bavarian State Opera and De Nederlandse Opera, as well as with the Staatstheater Stuttgart: Lady Macbeth von Mzensk, Wozzeck, Rigoletto, Simon Boccanegra, Hansel and Gretel, Falstaff and The Queen of Spades.

His production of Boris Godunov at the Bavarian State Opera was also shown at the grand opening of the New Opera house in Tel Aviv. He directed Othello in Stockholm, Fidelio, Eugene Onegin and King Roger by Karol Szymanowski in Amsterdam. The Zurich Opera was showplace to his production of Verdi's Aida as well as a highly regarded new version of Weber's Oberon.

Schaaf lived and worked for many years of his early career with actress Rosemarie Fendel; since 1984 he is married to opera singer .

Selected filmography

Director
 1963: Ein ungebetener Gast (TV)
 1964: Hotel Iphigenie (TV)
 1965: Im Schatten einer Großstadt (TV)
 1965: Die Gegenprobe (TV)
 1966: Große Liebe (TV)
 1965: Der Mann aus dem Bootshaus (TV)
 1967: Tattoo
 1971: Trotta
 1973: 
 1975: Der Kommissar – "Der Mord an Dr. Winter" (TV)
 1986: Momo

Actor
 1960: Aufruhr (TV)
 1960: Terror in der Waage (TV)
 1961: Die Nashörner (TV)
 1961: Zwischen den Zügen (TV), as Johnny
 1961: Unsere kleine Stadt (TV)
 1962: Die Feuertreppe (TV), as Eddie
 1967: Next Year, Same Time, as Spezie
 1970: First Love, as Nirmatsky
 1970: Bali, as Bradford
 1971: , as Gendarm Slama
 1971: Jaider, der einsame Jäger
 1973: Im Reservat (TV)
 1975: Der Kommissar – "Sturz aus großer Höhe" (TV), as Hans Werner Schäfer
 1975: Der Kommissar – "Der Held des Tages" (TV), as Robert Stimmel
 1975: John Glückstadt
 1983: , as Ing. Hübner

References

External links

Johannes Schaaf profile, Mariinsky Theatre

1933 births
2019 deaths
Film people from Stuttgart
German opera directors
Best Director German Film Award winners
University of Tübingen alumni
Humboldt University of Berlin alumni